North Long Street–Park Avenue Historic District is a national historic district located at Salisbury, Rowan County, North Carolina.  The district encompasses 46 contributing buildings in a predominantly residential section of Salisbury.  It was developed largely between about 1890 and 1925, and includes notable examples of Gothic Revival, Colonial Revival, and Bungalow / American Craftsman style. It was listed on the National Register of Historic Places in 1985.

Notable buildings include the McCubbins-McCanless-Clark House (c. 1890), Misenhimer-Rufty House (1904), D.C. Bradshaw House, Ellington-Brown House, Coggin-Ludwig House, and Park Ave United Methodist Church (1916).

References

Historic districts on the National Register of Historic Places in North Carolina
Gothic Revival architecture in North Carolina
Colonial Revival architecture in North Carolina
Buildings and structures in Rowan County, North Carolina
National Register of Historic Places in Rowan County, North Carolina